Free Again is an album by blues musician Robert Pete Williams recorded in 1960 and released on the Bluesville label in July the following year.

Reception

AllMusic stated: "Despite the constant, restless movement of Williams' guitar lines, these recordings have a stillness to them, as if the reverberation of his blunt, heavy attack might be the only sound for miles around. Intimately recorded by Oster himself, these ten solo guitar and vocal performances represent some of the finest of Williams' career and some of the best the blues has to offer".

Track listing
All compositions by Robert Pete Williams except where noted
 "Free Again" – 5:03
 "Almost Dead Blues" – 4:05
 "Rolling Stone" (Traditional) – 4:49
 "Two Wings" – 4:50
 "A Thousand Miles from Nowhere" – 5:17
 "Thumbing a Ride" – 4:38
 "I've Grown So Ugly" – 2:50
 "Death Blues" – 5:16
 "Hobo Worried Blues" – 4:10
 "Hay Cutting Song" – 4:13

Personnel

Performance
Robert Pete Williams – guitar, vocals

Production
 Kenneth S. Goldstein – producer
 Harry Oster – engineer

References

Robert Pete Williams albums
1961 albums
Bluesville Records albums